Eugert Zhupa (born 4 April 1990 in Rrogozhinë) is an Albanian former professional cyclist, who rode professionally between 2013 and 2019. He won the Albanian National Road Race Championships four times.

Major results

2009
 1st  Road race, National Road Championships
2011
 1st  Road race, National Road Championships
 9th Paris–Roubaix Espoirs
2012
 1st  Road race, National Road Championships
2013
 1st  Overall Tour of Albania
2015
 National Road Championships
1st  Time trial
2nd Road race
2016
 National Road Championships
1st  Road race
1st  Time trial
 1st Balkan Elite Road Classics
2018
 National Road Championships
1st  Time trial
2nd Road race
2019
 1st Stage 5 Tour of Albania

Grand Tour general classification results timeline

References

External links

1990 births
Living people
People from Rrogozhinë
Albanian male cyclists
Competitors at the 2013 Mediterranean Games
European Games competitors for Albania
Cyclists at the 2015 European Games
Mediterranean Games competitors for Albania